Feeling Blue is an album by jazz and R&B guitarist Phil Upchurch recorded in 1967 and released on the Milestone label.

Reception

Allmusic reviewed the album awarding it 3½ stars stating "There is more than the seed of genius at work on Feelin' Blue. These ten cuts were recorded over two days in September and October with two different ensembles... fine as it is, Feeling Blue was only a hint of the great things to come". All About Jazz correspondent David Rickert observed "Feeling Blue is a great jazz guitar record that, while flawed, displays a musician of considerable talent".

Track listing 
All compositions by Phil Upchurch except as indicated
 "Feeling Blue" – 3:10   
 "Stop and Listen" (Ritchie Adams, J. J. Woods) – 2:49   
 "Corcovado (Quiet Nights of Quiet Stars)" (Antônio Carlos Jobim) – 4:10   
 "Really Sincere" – 4:51   
 "Tangerine" (Johnny Mercer, Victor Schertzinger) – 3:36   
 "Up, Up and Away" (Jimmy Webb) – 2:41   
 "Israel" (John Carisi) – 4:00   
 "Sabaceous Lament" – 4:20   
 "Muscle Soul" (Leonard Brown) – 2:45   
 "I Want a Little Girl" (Murray Mencher, Billy Moll) – 6:31

Personnel 
Phil Upchurch – guitar
Wallace Davenport – trumpet (tracks 1, 2, 5, 6 & 9)
Eddie Pazant – alto saxophone (tracks 1, 2, 5, 6 & 9)
John Gilmore – tenor saxophone (tracks 1, 2, 5, 6 & 9)
Pat Patrick – baritone saxophone (tracks 1, 2, 5, 6 & 9)
Wynton Kelly – piano  (tracks 3, 4, 7, 8 & 10) 
Al Williams – piano, celeste (tracks 1, 2, 5, 6 & 9) 
Richard Davis – bass (tracks 3, 4, 7, 8 & 10)
Chuck Rainey – electric bass  (tracks 3, 4, 7, 8 & 10)
Jimmy Cobb (tracks 3, 4, 7, 8 & 10), Bernard Purdie (tracks 1, 2, 5, 6 & 9) – drums
Roger "Montego Joe" Sanders – congas (tracks 3, 4, 7, 8 & 10)
Warren Smith – congas, vibraharp (tracks 1, 2, 5, 6 & 9)
Ed Bland - arranger, conductor

References 

Phil Upchurch albums
1968 albums
Milestone Records albums
Albums produced by Orrin Keepnews
Instrumental albums